Muck Sticky (born Justin Osburn; 1977) is an American musician, songwriter, actor and artist. Muck Sticky has self-released eighteen albums since 2004, and was featured on the MTV series, $5 Cover.

Career
Born and raised in Memphis, Tennessee, Muck Sticky comes from a long line of musicians. His great-grandparents founded one of the first gospel bluegrass quartets in 1929 known as The Wayfaring Strangers, and both of his grandfathers were well known musicians. One was Gene Lowery of The Dixie Four who often recorded at Sun Studios in Memphis, and sang backing vocals for artists like Elvis Presley, Johnny Cash, Jerry Lee Lewis and Charlie Rich.

Between the ages of 16-23, Sticky was employed in many different fields including carpentry, restaurant service, bricklaying, water park lifeguard, and ice cream truck driver. In the year 2000, with the money he earned from his manual laborer job at a local convention service company, he bought an 8-track recorder and began creating his first album. In January 2001, he gave his first live performance at a “Battle of the Bands” concert in his hometown Memphis, TN. Since Sticky recorded all of his music alone, he decided to attach wigs, hats, sunglasses, and instruments to 6-foot tall floor lamps and call them his “band”. To this day he frequently brings them on stage during his shows, but the show has grown to include his mother, sister, best friends, and his fans.

Sticky was featured on the MTV series $5 Cover, which centers around the careers of singers from the Memphis, TN area. The show is produced by Craig Brewer, director and writer of the 2005 movie, Hustle & Flow.

He has released a feature film entitled Muscadine Wine.

A review described Sticky as an artist who "comes across as a backwoods midpoint between Beck and Mungo Jerry...somewhere between Slim Shady and Weird Al."

Discography
The Nifty Mervous Thrifty (2004)
The Sticky Muck (2005)
Muck Sticky Wants You (2006)
Bobolink Cove (2007)
Muck Sticky Is My Friend (2008)
The Best Of 5 (2010)
For The Kids (2010)
Hangin' With My Bud (2010)
The Amazing Discovery (2010)
Get This! (2011)
Hullabaloo (2012)
Schnickelfritz (2013)
Fantasterrific (2013)
The Brain Named Itself (2014)
Dang! (2015)
The Basics (2015)
The Nasty Tapes (2015)
Wacky! (2015)
Welcome Surprise (2016)
Higher Level (2020)
Man in Pajamas (2022)

Films
Muscadine Wine (2013)
Zeebo Newton (2018)

References

External links

Official - Facebook
Muck Sticky Fan Site
MTV - Artist's Page
MTV's $5 Cover
Bio on Muck Sticky by Jambase.com

1977 births
Cannabis music
Living people
People from Memphis, Tennessee
21st-century American singers
21st-century American male singers